The Myrtoan Sea (also Mirtoan Sea; , Myrtoo Pelagos ) is a subdivision of the Mediterranean Sea that lies between the Cyclades and Peloponnese.  It is described as the part of the Aegean Sea south of Euboea, Attica, and Argolis. Some of the water mass of the Black Sea reaches the Myrtoan Sea, via transport through the Aegean Sea (Saundry, Hogan & Baum 2011).

The Saronic Gulf, the gulf of Athens, lies between the Corinth Canal and the Myrtoan Sea.

It is said to have been named after the mythical hero Myrtilus, who was thrown into this sea by an enraged Pelops.  The name has also been connected with that of the maiden Myrto.  It is also said to have derived its name from a small island named Myrtus.

References

Citations

Classical sources
Horace makes a reference to Mare Myrtoum in Liber I, Carmen I, line 14 ("Ad Maecenatem"). — 
Pliny the Elder (iv. 11. s. 18) considers the Myrtoan a part of the Aegean.
Strabo distinguishes between the Myrtoan and Aegean; Strabo wrote that the Aegean terminated at the promontory of Sunium in Attica.

Modern sources
 Peter Saundry, C.Michael Hogan & Steve Baum. 2011. Sea of Crete. Encyclopedia of Earth. Eds.M.Pidwirny & C.J.Cleveland. National Council for Science and Environment. Washington DC.

Marginal seas of the Mediterranean
Aegean Sea
Seas of Greece
Landforms of the South Aegean